Mis Mejores Canciones:17 Super Éxitos (English: My Best Hits: 17 Super Hits) is the first official compilation album by Mexican pop singer Mijares.

Track listing
Tracks[]:
 Bonita
 No Hace Falta
 Bella
 Que Nada Nos Separe
 Siempre
 El Breve Espacio
 El Rey de la Noche
 Baño de Mujeres
 Para Amarnos Más
 Un Hombre Discreto
 Uno Entre Mil
 Soldado del Amor
 No Se Murió el Amor
 Persona a Persona
 Alfonsina
 Me Acordaré de Ti
 El Amor No Tiene Fronteras

1992 greatest hits albums
Manuel Mijares compilation albums